Streptococcus downei is a Gram-positive bacterium, with type strain MFe28 (NCTC 11391T). It is thought to be cariogenic.

References

Further reading
 
 Monchois, Vincent, Martha Arguello-Morales, and Roy RB Russell. "Isolation of an Active Catalytic Core ofStreptococcus downei MFe28 GTF-I Glucosyltransferase." Journal of Bacteriology 181.7 (1999): 2290–2292.

External links
 
 LPSN
 Type strain of Streptococcus downei at BacDive -  the Bacterial Diversity Metadatabase

Streptococcaceae
Gram-positive bacteria
Bacteria described in 1988